= Manourou Gakou =

French basketball player (born 1983)

Manourou Gakou (born 12 January 1983 in Paris) is a French basketball player who played professionally for French Pro A league club Chalon during the 2002–2003 season.
